is a series of manga versions of classic literature. Published by East Press, the aim of the series is to introduce average manga readers to important literary works they would otherwise not be aware of or willing to read. The series received press coverage for its publication of often controversial political treatises. East Press published best-selling versions of the communist novel Kanikōsen, Karl Marx's Das Kapital and Adolf Hitler's Mein Kampf. Some of the books were translated and made available in other languages such as English, Portuguese, and Spanish.

Manga de Dokuha was launched by East Press in an effort to expose young Japanese people to classic works of literature in a manga format. Kosuke Maruo produces each book in the series and outlines the narrative while artwork is created by Variety Art Works. The books in the series were often sold through easily accessible convenience stores, including 7-Eleven. Maruo said: "We thought that maybe we could get people to read well-known works perceived as tough reads by turning them into manga and selling them at convenience stores". In July 2008, the series' first 17 entries had sold over 900,000 copies. The average sales for an entry in the series were around 35,000.

Significant entries

Kanikōsen and Das Kapital 

 (published in English as The Crab Canning Ship or The Crab Ship) is a 1929 Japanese novel by Takiji Kobayashi. Written from a left-wing political perspective, the book follows the crew of a crab fishing ship living under oppressive conditions while being exploited by capitalists. The novel which typically sells around 5,000 copies a year became an unexpected bestseller in 2008 and sold over 507,000 copies that year. The same year, East Press published its own manga version of the novel which sold over 200,000 copies. In response to the popularity of the communist-themed Kanikōsen manga, East Press published a manga version of Karl Marx's 1867 treatise Das Kapital. This version presents the original Marxist anti-capitalist principles via the fictionalized tale of Robin, the owner of a cheese factory who experiences guilt for exploiting his workers and betraying his father's socialist principles. Maruo stated that "I think people are looking to Marx for answers to the problems with capitalist society. Obviously, the recent global crisis suggests that the system isn't working properly". East Press's edition of Das Kapital sold 6,000 copies in its first few days of publication.

The renewed success of both the novel and manga versions of Kanikōsen as well as that of the manga Das Kapital were often discussed in the context of the rising popularity of left-wing literature in Japan, the late-2000s recession affecting Japan and growing membership of the Japanese Communist Party. According to Waseda University literature professor Hirokazu Toeda, "Kanikōsen is discussed and analyzed every time a critical social issue occurs – the disparity society, severe labor conditions, consumer product falsification, random killings. This is a unique characteristic of the Kanikōsen boom and it now is symbolizing or mirroring all those negative aspects of current day Japan". Daisuke Asao, a senior office of the National Confederation of Trades Unions, said that "the situation of those labourers in the book is very similar to modern temporary workers: the unpredictable contracts, the working under heavy supervision, violence from supervisors, the widespread sexual harassment and the pressure against unionisation are all things that modern Japanese recognise every day". Anti-poverty activist Kosuke Hashimoto responded to the books' popularity, saying: "I think many young people in Japan are afraid of the future, and that fear is sometimes turning to anger. Reading comics might only be the start". Social welfare advocate Kaori Katada said: "Poverty has been a growing and visible problem for some time, but now people are looking for answers about why it is returning. That's why they're turning to these books".

Mein Kampf 
A version of Adolf Hitler's  was published in October 2008. The book is Hitler's autobiography in which he outlines his Nazi political ideology. The manga version of Mein Kampf was a minor commercial success, selling 45,000 copies. However, it also proved to be controversial. The Financial Ministry of Bavaria which owns the copyright to the book and has refused to publish it in Germany issued a statement saying that manga was an inappropriate medium for Hitler's writing. Bavaria's former Japanese representative Toshio Obata stated: "Even 60 years after the end of war, Nazism remains a sensitive issue in Germany. Did East Press exhaust discussions before publishing it? Did it consider the difference between Japan and Germany as to how manga is viewed as a medium?" Maruo defended its publication, saying "Mein Kampf is a well-known book, but relatively few people have read it. We think this will provide clues about Hitler as a human being, as to his way of thinking that led to such tragedy, even though he was dismissed as a 'monster. The publication of the manga helped reignite the debate in Germany as to whether the ban on the book should be lifted.

International publications
Between November 2011 and November 2012, JManga made available online 14 Manga de Dokuha titles in English, namely No Longer Human, Das Kapital, The Strange Case of Dr. Jekyll and Mr. Hyde, Night on the Galactic Railroad, The Book of Five Rings, I Am a Cat, Seton's Wild Animals, Sutta Nipata, One Thousand and One Nights, The Metamorphosis, Journey to the West, In Search of Lost Time, The Art of War and The Narrow Road to the Deep North. One Peace Books also released Don Quixote, The Great Gatsby, Moby-Dick, Ulysses and The War of the Worlds as part of its "Manga Classic Readers" series on 1 September 2012. Canadian company Red Quill Books physically published Das Kapital in 2012 as Capital in Manga!.

Spanish division of Verlag Herder publishes the series in the country since 2011. Thus Spoke Zarathustra, Divine Comedy, The Prince, The Art of War, The Social Contract, Das Kapital, Iliad and Odyssey (in a single book), Nineteen Eighty-Four, The Antichrist, Analects and Tao Te Ching are the eleven books published by the company.

In Brazil, Editora JBC published The Capital and King Lear in 2011. Two years later, L&PM Editores published The Art of War, The Great Gatsby, Hamlet, and Thus Spoke Zarathustra. Between 2013 and 2016, L&PM published the Manifesto of the Communist Party, The Metamorphosis, The Social Contract, The Brothers Karamazov, In Search of Lost Time, and Ulysses. A box containing The Brothers Karamazov, The Great Gatsby, The Metamorphosis and Thus Spoke Zarathustra was also released in 2015. In 2021, Veneta published Kanikosen.

List of entries

References

External links 
 Official East Press Manga de Dokuha website 

Manga series